Pikalin is a rural locality (a khutor) in Dukmasovskoye Rural Settlement of Shovgenovsky District, the Republic of Adygea, Russia. The population was 61 as of 2018. There is 1 street.

Geography 
Pikalin is located 36 km southwest of Khakurinokhabl (the district's administrative centre) by road. Mamatsev is the nearest rural locality.

References 

Rural localities in Shovgenovsky District